In an out of competition attempt to break the world record, in the military press, Khristos Iakovou of Greece attempted a lift of 179.0 kg, his attempt failed.  David Berger of Israel was one of the victims of the 5 September 1972, Munich Massacre.

Results
Total of best lifts in military press, snatch and jerk.  Ties are broken by the lightest bodyweight.

Final

Key: OR = Olympic record; DNF = did not finish; NVL = no valid lift

References

External links
Official report

Weightlifting at the 1972 Summer Olympics